Lynford is a village and civil parish in the Breckland District of Norfolk. It lies deep within Breckland forestry land between the Stanford Battle Area and Thetford Forest.
 
Lynford is served by Our Lady of Consolation and Saint Stephen chapel of ease joined to Saint Mary's Catholic Church, Thetford.

Lynford Hall, which is actually closer to Mundford, was rebuilt in the 19th century by Stephens Lyne-Stephens who was known as the richest commoner in England. The hall is now a hotel and conference centre. Lynford Arboretum and Lakes, formerly part of Lynford Hall estate, is now owned by the Forestry Commission.

Grimes Graves, the only Neolithic flint mine open to visitors in Great Britain, lie a mile to the south. Lynford Quarry is one of only two sites on mainland Britain which has evidence of Neanderthal occupation.

References

Breckland District
Civil parishes in Norfolk
Villages in Norfolk